The 2010 Individual Speedway Junior World Championship was the 34th edition of the FIM World motorcycle speedway Under-21 Championships.

For the first time a champion would be determined from three races between 17 July and 2 October 2010. 

Three riders (the 2009 Champion Darcy Ward, Maciej Janowski and Maksims Bogdanovs all tied on 30 points after the three races meaning a run-off was needed to decide the medals. Ward became the second rider to win the Under-21 World Champion title twice, after Emil Sayfutdinov (2007 and 2008 champion) after beating Janowksi and Bogdanovs in the run-off.

Qualification 

In five Qualifying round was started 80 riders and to Semi-finals was qualify top 6 from each meetings. This 30 riders and 2 riders from Semi-final' host federations (Matija Duh of Slovenia and Kevin Wölbert of Germany) was started in two Semi-finals. The top 7 riders from both SF was automatically qualify for all Final meetings.

Riders 
There were fourteen permanent riders (riders placed 1st to 7th in both semi finals was automatically qualify for all Final meetings). Two Wild Card riders was nominated to each final meeting (approval and nomination by CCP Bureau). Two Track Reserve riders was nominated by national federation.

In case of the absence of one or more riders in the final meetings, the first available Qualified Substitute rider or riders was elevated for that meeting, and take the place(s) of the relevant missing rider(s). The list of Qualified Substitute riders should by published by the CCP after the Semi-finals.

A starting position draw for each final meeting was balloted by the FIM.

Permanent riders 
Top 7 riders from Semi-final One in Krško, Slovenia
  Maksims Bogdanovs (21)
  Patrick Hougaard (21)
  Vadim Tarasenko (16)
  Patryk Dudek (18)
  Artem Laguta (20)
  Matěj Kůs (21)
  Jurica Pavlic (21)
Top 7 riders from Semi-final Two in Landshut, Germany
  Dennis Andersson (19)
  Martin Vaculík (20)
  Maciej Janowski (19)
  Frank Facher (21)
  Kevin Wölbert (21)
  René Bach (20)
  Darcy Ward (18)

Will card and track reserve riders 
Final One in Gdańsk, Poland
  Artur Mroczka (21)
  Damian Sperz (20)
  Marcel SzymkoTR (18)
  Szymon WoźniakTR (17)

Final One in Daugavpils, Latvia
  Vjačeslavs Giruckis (21)
  Przemysław Pawlicki (19)
  Jevgēņijs KaravackisTR (20)
  Igors AntonenkoTR (16)

Final Three in Pardubice, Czech Republic
  Jan Holub III (19)
  Václav Milík, Jr. (17)
  Roman ČejkaTR (18)
  René VidnerTR (17)

TR - track reserves

Qualified Substitute 
Unpublished by the CCP.

Final Series

Classification 
The meeting classification will be according to the points scored during the meeting (heats 1–20). The total points scored by each rider during each final meeting (heat 1–20) will be credited also as World Championship points. The FIM Speedway Under 21 World Champion will be the rider having
collected most World Championship points at the end of the series. In case of a tie between one or more riders in the final overall classification, a run-off will decide the 1st, 2nd and 3rd place. For all other placings, the better-placed rider in the last final meeting will be the better placed rider.

See also 
 2010 Speedway Grand Prix
 2010 Team Speedway Junior World Championship

References 

 
2010
World Individual Junior
Speedway competitions in Poland
2010 in Polish speedway